Bill Macks Creek is a stream in Douglas County, Missouri. The stream headwaters lie just east of Basher and the junction of Missouri Route 76 with Missouri Route U. The stream flows east-southeast to its confluence with Bryant Creek.
 
Bill Macks Creek has the name of Bill Mac, a pioneer trapper.

See also
List of rivers of Missouri

References

Rivers of Douglas County, Missouri
Rivers of Missouri